Stopnik is a settlement in the Municipality of Vransko in central Slovenia. The area is part of the traditional region of Styria. The municipality is now included in the Savinja Statistical Region.

The local church is dedicated to Saints Hermagoras and Fortunatus and belongs to the Parish of Vransko. It dates to the 15th century with some 17th- and 19th-century rebuilding.

To the west of the settlement are also the ruins of Stopnik Castle, first mentioned in the 12th century and abandoned around 1800.

References

External links
Stopnik at Geopedia

Populated places in the Municipality of Vransko